The 9th Independent Spirit Awards, honoring the best in independent filmmaking for 1993, were announced on March 19, 1994 at the Hollywood Palladium. The nominations were announced on January 14, 1994. Actor and director Robert Townsend hosted the ceremony, which was previously a position held on to for eight consecutive years by Buck Henry.

Controversy
The announcement of this year's nominations—made by a committee of a governing body called the Independent Features Project West—was postponed due to a confusion over the eligibility of Gramercy Pictures' drama A Dangerous Woman. The IFPW board determined that the film, which initially had received two nominations, had been partially funded by Universal Pictures and thus was not eligible, according to then-IFPW President Cathy Main; Gramercy Pictures is jointly owned by Universal Pictures and PolyGram Filmed Entertainment. In response, Gramercy Pictures President Russell Schwartz said the IFPW's rules "make no sense" and the IFPW is "as archaic as the (Academy of Motion Picture Arts and Sciences') foreign language rules". Schwartz also added that Universal's only involvement was to guarantee a bank loan to the filmmaker and its money was not used.

Winners and nominees

Films with multiple nominations and awards

Films that received multiple nominations

Films that won multiple awards

Special awards

John Cassavetes Award
 Jim Jarmusch

Special Distinction Award
 Sandra Schulberg

References

External links
 1993 Spirit Awards at IMDb
 Official ceremony on YouTube

1993
Independent Spirit Awards